The Elma ASW-600 is an anti-submarine warfare system designed by the Saab Group and used by the Royal Swedish Navy. It is designated in Antiubåts-granatkastarsystemen 83 in Sweden, and was previously called the Elma LLS-920.

History
The ASW-600 was initially designed in the 1980s. In 2018, the Defence Materiel Administration announced it would be reintroducing the system aboard Koster-class mine countermeasures vessels.

Export
In 1993, the Swedish Parliamentary Advisory Council on the Export of War Materials approved the export of the ASW-600 to Indonesia.

References

Anti-submarine mortars
Saab